Slipways is a video game developed by Beetlewing.  It combines gameplay from puzzle games and 3X (4X without war) while avoiding micromanagement.

Gameplay 
Slipways incorporates gameplay inspired by space empire turn-based grand strategy but without war. Players focus on resource management and graph optimization to grow their empire. The galaxy is procedurally generated, and different alien races assist in each playable sector.  Each alien race has their own priorities, such as performing research or establishing new colonies, and will reward players for accomplishing tasks related to their priorities.  As new worlds are discovered and colonized, they must be efficiently integrated into the empire's trade routes.  Each planet has desired imports and exports.  Goods not exported cause unemployment, and goods not imported cause resource shortages.  Researching new technologies can open different ways to satisfy these desires, and desires can change over time.  If the empire's populace become too unhappy or the player runs out of money, the game ends.  In a standard game, players compete for a high score by the final turn.  Alternatively, a sandbox mode allows endless building, and a campaign mode offers more challenging puzzles.

Development 
Slipways was created by Polish developer Jakub Wasilewski.  He originally implemented a prototype of the game on the PICO-8, a virtual machine in the style of a game console, using a pay what you want model.  Wasilewski wanted to streamline out the parts of strategy games that he found to be busy-work or excessive micromanagement.  Instead of managing individual planets, Wasilewski focused on the logistics of an empire.  War slowed these games down too much, so he completely removed it.  He was also interested in an empire-building game that did not depict war as unavoidable.  When Wasilewski polled the PICO-8 players, he found they did not consider war to be a priority feature, so he stuck to the original design when developing the commercial game.  The game was released June 4, 2021.

Reception 
Reviewing a pre-release version of the game, Andy Kelly of PC Gamer wrote, "It's a wonderfully simple, streamlined strategy game, but still makes you feel like you're building something grand."  Nic Reuben of Rock Paper Shotgun described Slipways as "a phenomenally smart piece of design" that pits players against their own poor impulses instead of AI-controlled players.  Rock Paper Shotgun subsequently listed it among the best space games for the PC, best PC strategy games, and best the best games released in 2021.  Writing for Wireframe Magazine, Ian Dransfield called it "a focused, delightful puzzle game masquerading as space empire-based grand strategy."

References

External links 
 

2021 video games
Windows games
MacOS games
Single-player video games
Indie video games
Science fiction video games
Turn-based strategy video games
Video games developed in Poland
Video games set in outer space
Puzzle video games